Asha Rani is an Indian politician  belonging to the Bharatiya Janata Party. She was a member of the Madhya Pradesh Legislative Assembly in India until convicted on charges of having abducted a maid and abetted in her death by burning.

She was elected from Bijawar of  Madhya Pradesh seat in the 2008 state assembly elections.

Tijji Bai abduction and death
Her husband Ashok Veer Vikram Singh, a former Samajwadi Party member of the state assembly and a strongarm politician, had abducted Tijji and brought her to Bhopal where she became a bonded labourer.

In 2007, Tijji Bai set herself aflame. The incident became well known when neighbours saw her in flames, but instead of running around she was sitting quietly.  Though a charge was registered, it was not followed up.

In May 2013, her husband was convicted in a murder case.  Subsequently, the Tijji-Bai case was investigated, and Asha Rani was charged. She then went into hiding for several months.  When she was about to lose her state assembly seat for missing sessions for 60 days, she emerged to attend the assembly and was arrested. She was convicted in 2013 and sentenced to ten years in jail. She was disqualified as a member of the legislative assembly under the provisions of the Representation of the People Act which disqualifies those who has been convicted under certain laws. She was the first legislator from the state and the first female legislator in the country to be disqualified under the law.

References

Living people
People from Chhatarpur district
Madhya Pradesh MLAs 2008–2013
Bharatiya Janata Party politicians from Madhya Pradesh
Indian politicians disqualified from office
21st-century Indian women politicians
21st-century Indian politicians
Year of birth missing (living people)
Women members of the Madhya Pradesh Legislative Assembly